Shae may refer to:
 Shae (character), a fictional character from George R. R. Martin's A Song of Ice and Fire novel series
 Shae (given name), a unisex given name
 Shae (singer), an Indonesian singer

See also

 Sha (disambiguation)
 She (disambiguation)
 Shea (disambiguation)
 Shoe (disambiguation)